The Farakka Setu or Farakka Bridge is a four-lane bridge located 500 meters downstream of Farakka Barrage. The bridge is intended to reduce traffic congestion on the Farakka Barrage and to connect North and South Bengal. Once finished, the bridge, including the main and connecting bridge, will span . When the bridge is finished, it will be the longest bridge in West Bengal and one of the highest bridges in India. The total construction cost of the bridge has been estimated at ₹521 crore, or roughly 7 million USD. Construction began in January 2019. RKEC Projects is working on the construction of the bridge in conjunction with Qingdao Construction Engineering.

History

Project Approval
In October 2016, India's Union Council of Ministers passed a bill for the construction of the bridge. At the beginning of 2018, construction work was given to a foreign company.

Construction 
On January 1 2019, RKEC Projects began construction. Work began on the north bank of the Ganges from Lakshmipur in the Malda district and Farakka in the Murshidabad district on the south bank. Two separate roads cross the 4 lane bridge, each 12.5 meters wide.

Accident 
On February 16, 2020, while construction of a girder was underway between Pillars 1 and 2, the girder broke, causing 2 fatalities and 7 injuries.

References 

Bridges in West Bengal
Buildings and structures in Murshidabad district
Bridges over the Ganges